The Summer Garden (Letniy sad) is a historic public garden that occupies an eponymous island between the Neva, Fontanka, Moika, and the Swan Canal in downtown Saint Petersburg, Russia and shares its name with the adjacent Summer Palace of Peter the Great. Its inception dates back to early 18 century when Russia took these lands from Sweden in the Great Northern War. Being a monument of landscape architecture featuring original and copied sculptures of classical mythology characters, a former royal palace and a monument to the fable author Ivan Krylov, the garden is now a branch of the Saint Petersburg-based national art treasury Russian Museum.

Landscape design

Original
The park was personally designed by Tsar Peter in 1704, supposedly, with the assistance of the Dutch gardener and physician Nicolaas Bidloo. Starting from 1712, the planting of the Summer Garden was further elaborated by the Dutch gardener Jan Roosen, who was the chief gardener of the park till 1726. The well-known French architect Jean-Baptiste Le Blond, who arrived in St. Petersburg in 1716, added to the park the flavour of a Garden à la française. The Summer Garden was largely completed in 1719. The walks were lined with a hundred allegorical marble sculptures, executed by Francesco Penso, Pietro Baratta, Marino Gropelli, Alvise Tagliapietra, Bartolomeo Modulo and other Venetian sculptors that were acquired by Sava Vladislavich. In the late 20th century, 90 surviving statues were moved indoors, while modern replicas took their place in the park.

The sequence of patterned parterres, originally more formal than the current landscape, were the site of Imperial assemblies, or lavish parties which often included balls, feasts, and fireworks. Apart from the statuary, a major park attraction were the fountains, the oldest in Russia, representing scenes from Aesop's fables. Some of these fell out of use and were demolished after the 1777 inundation which destroyed the fountain machinery acquired by Peter the Great in Britain.

Later

A delicate iron-cast railing, separating the park from the public walk of the Palace Embankment, was installed between 1771 and 1784 to a design by Georg von Veldten. The grille is suspended between 36 granite columns crowned with urns and vases. The poet Anna Akhmatova, among others, considered the grille to be a pinnacle of art-casting and one of the symbols of St Petersburg.

In the 1820s, a grotto pavilion, attributed to Andreas Schlüter and Georg Johann Mattarnovy, was rebuilt into a coffee house. On the bank of the Carp Pond, a magnificent porphyry vase, a gift of Charles XIV of Sweden to the tsar, was installed in 1839. Fifteen years later, a famous monument to the children's writer Ivan Krylov was opened in the park. A sign of the progress of Romanticism in Russian official culture, it was the first monument to a poet erected in Eastern Europe.

On 4 April 1866 Dmitry Karakozov made the first attempt to assassinate the tsar when he walked out of the Summer Garden. As the attempt proved abortive, the ponderous Summergrille memorial chapel in a Russian Revival style was built over the gate. This reattachment was demolished by the Bolsheviks after the October Revolution.

The park was chosen by Alexander Pushkin as a setting for childhood walks of the fictional character Eugene Onegin.

Sculptures

Many of the sculptures now adorning the Summer Garden date back to the early 18th century. In the 19th century, the intended arrangement of the decorative sculptures in the Summer Garden was forgotten, quite a few of the sculptures were no longer extant, and those remaining were moved from place to place, thus destroying the original design. In late 20th century, all sculptures were rearranged and today they stand in accordance with the aesthetic ideas characteristic of the beginning of the 18th century. To protect sculptures from winter weather they have been traditionally covered with wooden cases and reopened in warm season and cleaned; to further safeguard valuable antiques, protecting them from vandalism as well, Russian Museum initiated copying them to keep in the adjacent St Michael's Castle (another branch of the same Museum), placing copies in the open garden.

See also 
 Alexander Garden (Saint Petersburg)

References

External links

The Summer Garden & Palace of Peter I
Wandering Camera in the Summer Garden
Houses and monuments of the Summer Garden
Autumn views of the Summer Garden
Winter views of the Summer Garden
[dead link: St Petersburg Russia - Parks]

Gardens in Saint Petersburg
Russian Baroque gardens
Sculpture gardens, trails and parks in Russia
Urban public parks
Art gallery districts
Parks and open spaces in Saint Petersburg
Cultural heritage monuments of federal significance in Saint Petersburg